The 1968 USAC Championship Car season consisted of 28 races, beginning in Hanford, California on March 17 and concluding in Riverside, California on December 7.  The USAC National Champion and Indianapolis 500 winner was Bobby Unser. Mike Spence died in an accident while practicing for the 1968 Indianapolis 500.  Ronnie Duman died of burns suffered during the Rex Mays Classic.

Schedule and results

 Run in two heats of 98 miles (158 kilometers) each.
 No pole is awarded for the Pikes Peak Hill Climb, in this schedule on the pole is the driver who started first. No lap led was awarded for the Pikes Peak Hill Climb, however, a lap was awarded to the drivers that completed the climb.
 Run in two heats of 100 miles (161 kilometers) each.

Final points standings

References
 
 
 http://media.indycar.com/pdf/2011/IICS_2011_Historical_Record_Book_INT6.pdf  (p. 244-249)

See also
 1968 Indianapolis 500

USAC Championship Car season
USAC Championship Car
1968 in American motorsport